Wrestling Isn't Wrestling is a 2015 short film written and directed by Max Landis. Released for free on YouTube, the film retells the story of WWE professional wrestler Triple H. Like Landis's 2012 short The Death and Return of Superman, it consists of a monologue by Landis on the subject matter, accompanied by sequences with actors performing the parts in the story.

Plot
In response to the common criticism that professional wrestling is "fake," Max Landis attempts to defend the sport as a legitimately compelling form of fiction. To make this point, he points out that modern professional wrestling contains multiple overtly unrealistic elements that hinge on willing suspension of disbelief, and notes that the scripted nature of wrestling matches doesn't make their stunt-work and choreography any less spectacular.

In an effort to prove that wrestling can be as entertaining as any other form of fiction, Landis recounts the story of his favorite wrestler Paul Levesque, better known by his ring name "Triple H". His retelling of Triple H's wrestling career starts with his early days as the wealthy and snobbish "Hunter Hearst Helmsley," continues with his friendship with Shawn Michaels and his co-founding of the rebellious and rambunctious "D-Generation X," and ultimately recounts his reign as World Heavyweight Champion, his time as the brutal and paranoid leader of "Evolution," and his reinvention as a powerful corporate strongman.

In recounting the evolution of Triple H's in-ring persona, Landis presents the interpretation that all of the wrestler's various gimmicks are different facets of the same character: an arrogant but deeply insecure man with an inferiority complex, who never got over the pain of being overshadowed by better wrestlers. The retelling ends with Triple H's ascension to COO of the WWE following his marriage to Stephanie McMahon; Landis suggests that Triple H sought power behind the scenes of the company because he could never achieve the glory that he truly desired in the ring.

Cast

Main
Max Landis as himself
Chloe Dykstra as Triple H
Ana Walczak as Shawn Michaels
Lola Blanc as The Undertaker
Andi Layne as John Cena
Lissy Smith, Clare Kramer, and Chloe West as DX Army
Kandiss Lewis as Stephanie McMahon
Nicole Stark as Randy Orton
Anna Akana as Batista
Sideara St. Claire as Ric Flair
Anna Lore as Daniel Bryan

Cameos
Adam Savage and Jamie Hyneman as themselves
Christina Scherer as Chris Benoit 
Cat Alter as Chris Jericho
Chris Bauer as a referee
Jenny Becerra as Mankind
Matt Bennett as a John Cena fan
David Arquette as himself
Graham Denman as Paul Bearer
Rose Chirillo Road Warrior Hawk
Charley Feldman as Road Warrior Animal
Brittany Furlan as Goldberg
Bill Goldberg as himself
Morgan Krantz as Superman
Hannah Landberg as Stone Cold Steve Austin
Clare Lourdes as X-Pac
Lissy Smith as Road Dogg
Alita LaShae as The Rock
Melodie Gore as CM Punk
Shelby Steel as Sheamus
Dani "Haystack" Manning as Kane
Milana Vayntrub as The Ultimate Warrior
Brad Gage and Matt Cohen as strip club crowd
Chloe West as Billy Gunn
Sam Witwer as Chyna
Seth Green and Macaulay Culkin as DX fans
Justin Roberts, Kat Leigh, Becky Bayless, DC Pierson, Matt Henderson, Adam Rifkin, Cambria Edwards, Josh Peck, Frankie Kazarian, Christopher Daniels, Ricardo Orta, David Blue, Christopher Wayne Thompson, Hannah Marks, Nicholas Braun, Haley Joel Osment, Shad Gaspard, Zack Pearlman, Stephen Lunsford, Colt Cabana, Olga Kay, Darren Criss, Ryan Nemeth, Chris Hero, Alicia Way, Marty DeRosa, Jordan Dobbs Rosa, Coy Jandeau, Brett Delby, Stephen Sorace, Rebecca Rowley, Jason Weiss, and JTG as theater audience members
John Landis as a therapist
Jon Schnepp as a Rabbi
Mars Argo as a ghostly girl
Joey Ryan as an '80s American wrestler
John Hennigan as an '80s Russian wrestler
Rosa Salazar, Moses Storm, and Shaun Brown as people watching Game of Thrones
Dustin Milligan as Bartender 1
Mike Diva as Bartender 2

Production
Funded entirely by Landis, the film was shot at thirty locations throughout Los Angeles over the course of three weeks. It features a cast of close to a hundred extras, with most people involved working for free. Ron Howard was intended to make a cameo appearance, as he did in The Death and Return of Superman, but was unavailable for filming. In a Reddit "Ask Me Anything" Landis mentioned that his father John Landis was initially hesitant to appear in the short due to an aversion to being involved in his son's work, but ultimately agreed once he saw the finished product.

Reception
Writing for the Wall Street Journal, Michael Calia said that Landis's characterization of wrestling as "packed with the stuff of fiction, both good and terrible" was "not exactly a new insight", but said that Landis "defends wrestling in a fun, inventive way". Writing for Progressive Boink, Bill Hanstock praised the short for not only serving as a comprehensive history of the Triple H character, but for delving into the "subtext, motive and narrative arc for a character that didn't really occur to me in precisely this way before." Users on Letterboxd currently rate the film 3.7 out of 5.

Initially, it was reported by Bryan Alvarez that employees of the WWE were told not to publicly comment on the video. Max Landis himself, however, responded to this on Twitter and clarified that this was simply due to the videos non family friendly content. The video was eventually praised by Triple H and Stephanie McMahon, both of whom it depicts as characters. The short earned Landis a position as a creative consultant on WWE Raw.

References

External links

2015 films
2015 short films
2015 comedy films
American comedy short films
Films directed by Max Landis
Films shot in Los Angeles
Professional wrestling films
Films with screenplays by Max Landis
Viral videos
2015 YouTube videos
2010s English-language films
2010s American films